The Wanda Sykes Show is an American talk show hosted by comedian Wanda Sykes on Fox that debuted on November 7, 2009. Comedian Keith Robinson co-starred as Sykes' sidekick.

The series was announced in March 2009 by Kevin Reilly. The show aired on Fox on Saturday nights, replacing MADtv and Talkshow with Spike Feresten.

On May 14, 2010, Fox announced that The Wanda Sykes Show was canceled after only one season. The decision left the Fox network with no original late-night programming for the first time since the 1994–95 season.

Episodes

References

External links 
 

2009 American television series debuts
2010 American television series endings
2000s American late-night television series
2010s American late-night television series
2000s American television talk shows
2010s American television talk shows
English-language television shows
Fox late-night programming
Television series by 20th Century Fox Television